The Skete of Prophet Elijah is a cenobitic skete of Pantokratoros monastery in Mount Athos, Greece.

It was founded in 1759 by Paisius Velichkovsky, a Ukrainian monk from Poltava. Within the complex are a main church (built 1903) and three chapels. There are also an extensive library and two icons reputedly with miraculous powers.

The historic  is located in the skete.

Notable people
George (Schaefer)

References

Elias
Greek Orthodox monasteries
Pantokratoros Monastery